The Belly of an Architect is a 1987 film drama written and directed by Peter Greenaway, featuring original music by Glenn Branca and Wim Mertens. Starring Brian Dennehy and Chloe Webb, it was nominated for the Palme d'Or (Golden Palm) award at the 1987 Cannes Film Festival.

Plot
American architect Stourley Kracklite has been commissioned to construct an exhibition in Rome dedicated to the architecture of the 18th-century French architect, Étienne-Louis Boullée, who until the 20th century remained little known. Kracklite's Italian colleagues express doubts about whether Boullée really belongs in the architectural pantheon; they note that few of his buildings were ever constructed and observe that Boullée was an inspiration for Adolf Hitler's architect Albert Speer.

As he works on the exhibition, Kracklite's marriage and health deteriorate. He becomes obsessed with Caesar Augustus, the first emperor of the Roman Empire, after hearing that Augustus's wife, Livia, supposedly poisoned him. Suffering from recurrent stomach pains, he suspects his much younger wife, Louisa, of trying to do the same. Louisa reveals that she is pregnant with Kracklite's child, conceived at the precise moment their train crossed the Italian border. Meanwhile, she has become sexually involved with Caspasian Speckler, the younger co-organiser of the exhibition. We learn that Caspasian has also been siphoning off funds from the exhibition, even as he and his Italian associates undermine Kracklite's authority and confidence. Kracklite himself is seduced by Caspasian's sister Flavia, a photographer in her apartment across from the Palazzo della Civiltà Italiana. The two are discovered in flagrante by Caspasian, who threatens to tell Louisa.

Louisa leaves Kracklite, who is diagnosed with stomach cancer and given only months to live. The film ends at the exhibition's opening ceremony, nine months after their arrival in Italy. Kracklite, now replaced as director by Caspasian, watches from a high vantage point as Louisa cuts the tape. As she suddenly goes into labor, Kracklite jumps to his death.

Cast
 Brian Dennehy as Stourley Kracklite
 Chloe Webb as Louisa Kracklite
 Lambert Wilson as Caspasian Speckler
 Sergio Fantoni as Io Speckler
 Stefania Casini as Flavia Speckler
 Vanni Corbellini as Frederico
 Alfredo Varelli as Julio
 Geoffrey Copleston as Caspetti
 Francesco Carnelutti as Pastarri
 Marino Masé as Trettorio
 Marne Maitland as Battistino
 Claudio Spadaro as Mori
 Rate Furlan as The Violinist
 Julian Jenkins as Old Doctor
 Enrica Maria Scrivano as Mother

Critical reception
Review aggregator website Rotten Tomatoes reports 85% approval of The Belly of an Architect based on 13 reviews, though with an average rating of 6.58/10.

References

External links
 

1987 films
1987 drama films
Adultery in films
British drama films
1980s English-language films
Films about architecture
Films about cancer
Films about suicide
Films directed by Peter Greenaway
Films scored by Wim Mertens
Films set in Rome
Italian drama films
British pregnancy films
1980s British films
1980s Italian films